The  Laredo–Colombia Solidarity International Bridge  is one of four vehicular international bridges located on the U.S.-Mexico border in the city of Laredo, Texas; it connects Laredo over the Rio Grande (Rio Bravo) with Colombia in Anáhuac, Nuevo León. It is owned and operated by the City of Laredo and the Secretaría de Comunicaciones y Transportes (Mexico's Federal Ministry of Communications and Transportation).

History
The Laredo–Colombia Solidarity International Bridge was named in honor of the Mexican planned community of Colombia, Nuevo León. The community and the international bridge were built because the Mexican state of Nuevo León, which has a very small border with the United States, wanted an international port to compete with the bordering states of Coahuila and Tamaulipas in the international trade market. Access to the Rio Grande and an international crossing secure that port. Indeed, the Laredo–Colombia Solidarity International Bridge is the only border crossing between Nuevo León and Texas.

Description
The Laredo–Colombia Solidarity International Bridge is an eight-lane bridge with two walkways for pedestrians. The international bridge is for all traffic, including pedestrians. The bridge is also known as Laredo International Bridge 3, Colombia Bridge, Puente Solidaridad, Puente Colombia and Puente Internacional Solidaridad Colombia.

On the United States side, the bridge connects to Texas State Highway 255, a road that bypasses downtown Laredo and connects to Interstate 35. On the Mexico side, the bridge connects to Nuevo Leon State Highway 1 Spur which in turn connects it to Highway 1 proper.

Location 
This bridge is located at the western terminus of State Highway 255, near its intersection with FM 1472, in Laredo, Texas and the northern terminus of Nuevo León State Highway Spur 1 in Colombia, Anáhuac Municipality.

Border crossing

The Laredo Columbia Solidarity Port of Entry was built in 1991 in an effort to relieve traffic from the congested downtown Laredo bridges.

Operational hours 
Commercial Vehicles
Sunday: 10:00 AM–2:00 PM
Weekdays: 8:00 AM–10:30 PM
Saturday: 9:00 AM–4:00 PM

Non-commercial Vehicles
All Days: 8:00 AM–12:00 AM

All times Central Time Zone

References

External links 
 Laredo-Colombia Solidarity International Bridge Webcam (American Side)
 Laredo-Colombia Solidarity International Bridge Webcam (Mexican Side)
 Aerial View of Laredo-Colombia Solidarity International Bridge
 Statistical Data

International bridges in Laredo, Texas
International bridges in Nuevo León
Nuevo León
Toll bridges in Texas
Bridges completed in 1992
Road bridges in Texas
Toll bridges in Mexico
Box girder bridges in the United States
Box girder bridges